Luca Incollingo (born 26 May 1987) is an Italian sprint canoeist.

He participated at the 2018 ICF Canoe Sprint World Championships.

References

1987 births
Italian male canoeists
Living people
ICF Canoe Sprint World Championships medalists in Canadian
European Games competitors for Italy
Canoeists at the 2019 European Games
21st-century Italian people